SM City Santa Rosa is a shopping mall owned and operated by SM Prime Holdings. It is located along Old National Highway (Manila South Road), Barangay Tagapo, Santa Rosa, Laguna, Philippines. Opened in 2006, it is the first SM Supermall in the province of Laguna.

Physical details
It is located at Manila South Road (also known as the Old National Highway or National Highway) corner Biñan–Santa Rosa Access Road in Barangay Tagapo, Santa Rosa, Laguna. It features more than 350 shops and various dining establishments. Anchors for SM City Santa Rosa are SM Supermarket, The SM Store, Ace Hardware, SM Appliance Center and a food court. The mall also has retail anchors like Uniqlo and Miniso and also features four digital cinemas at the second floor and a garden (known as The Rainforest) at the center of the mall.

The Cyberzone was opened in October 2012 at the former area of The Event Center.

Expansion Wing

It opened on June 24, 2022. The main feature in this new wing is the staircase with its LED video screen.

Mall complex developments

The Core
It also contains a four-level parking space and is interconnected to the mall via a footbridge with the Expansion Wing.

Santa Rosa Integrated Terminal

The mall also features a Santa Rosa Integrated Terminal located at the former south parking area of the mall. It is the second of three planned provincial intermodal terminals for the south of Manila under a public-private partnership arrangement and opened on March 26, 2019.

SMDC Park Residences
The Park Residences at SM City Santa Rosa has a 14-tower, mid-rise residential condominium project with a total of 1,864 residential units and is located at the back of the mall. It also features an expansive central park that is inspired by New York City's Central Park.

Incidents
February 3, 2015: A shootout occurred at one of the mall's entrances when a 16-year-old male suspect was unable to enter the mall because he brought in a bladed weapon. The suspect reportedly took a gun and killed a policeman. Another policeman gunned down the suspect.
March 5, 2023: About 20 mallgoers were injured when one of the mall's escalators that they rode malfunctioned.

See also
 SM Supermalls

References

Shopping malls in Laguna (province)
Shopping malls established in 2006
Buildings and structures in Santa Rosa, Laguna
SM Prime